Bunter Pebble Beds is the name formerly given to a set of sandstone deposits within the New Red Sandstone containing rounded pebbles. They are thought to be alluvial deposits and, judging from the rounding of the mainly quartzite pebbles, to have resulted from prolonged transportation in a large and turbulent river, resulting in powerful abrasion.

Etymology
The name "Bunter" derives from the German term "Buntsandstein", "bunt" meaning "variegated" or "colourful", referring to the colour of the sandstone deposit, which varies from reddish to greenish.

Utility
The pebbles, also called cobbles, which can be used as gravel, as ballast or as cobblestones, are mainly milky-white quartzite but can vary in colour and composition, including some that are hard, reddish-coloured sandstone. The sandstone in which these pebbles are deposited can be used for building or as an aggregate for cement or concrete.

The sandstone can be hard enough for building, yet easy enough to "work", resulting in bridges, castles, cathedrals and churches constructed of reddish sandstone, throughout the relevant areas of Europe (e.g. Germany, Luxembourg, Switzerland, Alsace in France, Denmark, Poland). A notable example is Heidelberg in the German state of Baden-Württemberg, whose old town, including the Old Bridge and the castle, is built mostly from the local Odenwald sandstone. Within the parkland surrounding the castle ramparts, there is also a publicly accessible outcrop mentioned in many local nature guides, where the succession from greyish granite to reddish buntsandstein is marked clearly by an eroded gap. The architecture of the surrounding former Palatinate territory, as well as the neighbouring Rhenish Hesse, modern Palatinate, Odenwald and Alsace areas traditionally make use of the building material for representative and public buildings, among them the historically important Straßburger Münster, and the Imperial Cathedrals of Speyer, Mainz, and Worms, as well as many burgeois residences, manors and medieval castles like Trifels and the Château du Haut-Kœenigsburg.

Location
The deposits in the English Midlands are thought to have been transported in this way northwards from Brittany, France. This supposed river has been called the "Budleighensis", after the Devon village of Budleigh Salterton, a site where such deposits were discovered. Their deposition took place in the early Triassic period. Some newer conglomerates, e.g. near Ryton in Warwickshire, are thought to have arisen during the Ice Age by reworking and southward transportation of older deposits by ice flows.

They can be found in Warwickshire, Cheshire, Staffordshire, Nottinghamshire, Yorkshire, Devon and Dorset in England. 
This sandstone is widespread across central Europe, notably in the Black Forest and Odenwald region of Germany, as well as the Vosges Mountains in northeastern France.
The land under which these beds lie is generally very well drained, creating heathlike conditions. Because of the drainage, the soil tends to be of low fertility. A notable area in Britain that has these characteristics is Cannock Chase, a designated Area of Outstanding Natural Beauty (AONB).

The long shingle tombolo of Chesil Beach in Dorset and the raised beach of Portland, Dorset are partly composed of Bunter pebbles.

Further reading

References

Sandstone
Masonry
Stone (material)
Geology of England
Triassic Europe